The men's individual nordic combined competition for the 1998 Winter Olympics in Nagano at Hakuba Ski Jumping Stadium and Snow Harp on 13 and 14 February.

Results

Ski Jumping

Athletes did two normal hill ski jumps. The combined points earned on the jumps determined the starting order and times for the cross-country race; each point was equal to a six-second deficit.

Cross-Country

The cross-country race was over a distance of 15 kilometres.

References

Nordic combined at the 1998 Winter Olympics